On 29 July 2013, two passenger trains were involved in a head-on collision at Granges-près-Marnand, Switzerland, killing one person and injuring 25 others.

Accident
At 18:50 CEST (16:50 UTC), two passenger trains were involved in a head-on collision at Granges-près-Marnand, Vaud, Switzerland, on the Palézieux–Payerne line. Initially, it was reported that up to 44 people were injured, five seriously. This was later revised to 25 injured. The 24-year-old driver of the train heading to Granges-près-Marnand was killed in the crash: His body was recovered in the early hours of 30 July. The injured were taken to hospitals in Lausanne and Payerne. All but three of the injured had been discharged from hospital by 30 July. Both of the trains were operated by Swiss Federal Railways.

Disruption
As a result of the accident, train services were suspended between Moudon and Payerne. A bus replacement service was provided. The line was scheduled to be reopened in the afternoon of 30 July.

Investigation
At the time, the Swiss Accident Investigation Board (SAIB) were responsible for investigating railway accidents in Switzerland. The wrecked trains were moved to Yverdon where they were examined by the investigators.

Cause
Initial reports indicated that the local train at Grange-près-Marnand station did not wait for the arrival of the incoming train from Payerne and left the station too soon. The SAIB final report shows that the accident was caused by train 12976 departing from Granges-près-Marnard against a red signal.

See also
 List of rail accidents (2010–present)

References

Railway accidents in 2013
Train collisions in Switzerland
2013 in Switzerland
Transport in the canton of Vaud
Railway accidents involving a signal passed at danger
July 2013 events in Europe
2013 disasters in Switzerland